The siege of Maribor may refer to:
Siege of Maribor (1481), by the forces of the Kingdom of Hungary, led by their King Matthias Corvinus
Siege of Maribor (1532), by the forces of the Ottoman Empire, led by their Sultan Suleiman the Magnificent
Siege of Maribor (1683), by the forces of the Ottoman Empire